Neoen is a French producer of exclusively renewable energy  headquartered in Paris, France.  Founded in 2008, it develops, finances, builds and operates solar power plants, wind farms and energy storage solutions.  As at 31 December 2021, the company's total capacity was 5.4 GW, made up of 50% solar, 38% wind and 12% battery storage. Neoen aims to attain 10 GW in operation and under construction by 2025.

Neoen is owner and operator of the Cestas solar plant (near Bordeaux, France), the largest of its kind in Europe (300 MWp) at the time of its commissioning in 2014; of Hornsdale Power Reserve in Australia, the world'’s largest lithium-ion battery storage unit (100 MW / 129 MWh) when it was commissioned in 2017; of the Victorian Big Battery (300 MW / 450 MWh), one of the largest batteries in the world; and of Providencia Solar (101 MWp), the largest solar plant in Central America, commissioned in 2016.

History 
Founded in 2008, Neoen opened its first power plant in France in 2009 and reached its break even point in 2011. In 2014, the company began its international development with the opening of three solar plants in Portugal: Seixal, Coruche and Cabrela. Cestas, the most powerful solar plant in Europe with 300 MWp, was opened in south-west France in 2015. In 2016 Neoen commissioned the largest solar park in Central America (101 MWp). The company's total capacity in operation and under construction exceeded 1 GW. The following year (2017), Neoen opened the world's largest storage plant in Hornsdale, Australia (100 MW/129 MWh) and announced its intention to triple its business by 2020.

The company went public on 16 October 2018, entering Euronext compartment A, with the support of its historical shareholders. It became the youngest French company in its field to surpass  a capitalization of one billion euros.   The same year, its total capacity in operation and under construction reached 2 GW.

In 2019, Neoen sold its only biomass unit and continued its international expansion, with an  agreement to provide wind power for Google in Finland and the financing of a 375-MWp solar park in Mexico providing energy at US$18.93 per MWh. That year, the company reached the milestone of 1 GW of assets in Australia alone.

In 2020, building work began on the Yllikkälä Power Reserve in Finland (30 MW/30 MWh) and the Victorian Big Battery in Australia (300 MW/450 MWh). Work also began on Western Downs (460 MWp), Neoen’s largest solar park and Australia's and Neoen's largest solar parkthe largest of its kind in Australia.

In June 2020, the company entered the SBF120, MSCI France Small Cap Index and S&P Global Clean Energy  indexes.

In April 2021 Neoen increased its capital by €600 million. The company had 4.1 GW in operation and under construction in 15 countries and set itself the target of 10 GW by 2025.

Neoen reached the milestone of 1 GW of renewable energy under operation or construction in France. In December, the Victorian Big Battery (300 MW / 450 MWh) was commissioned. It is the largest battery in Australia and one of the biggest in the world. In December, the company also began construction of its largest wind farm, Goyder Renewables Zone (412 MW) in Australia.

In April 2022, Neoen launched a virtual battery service, with AGL Energy as its first customer.

Activities 
Neoen operates in the solar power, onshore wind farm and battery storage markets.

Its turnover for 2021 was 333.6 million, made up of 49% solar power (€162.3 million, +13%), 41% wind power (€135.1 million, +11%) and 10% storage (€34.4 million, +5%).

As at December 2021, Neoen is present in 16 countries across three geographic regions.: Australia (48% of capacity in operation and under construction),; America (16%); and Europe/Africa 36%.

As at December 2021, the company’s capacity in operation and under construction was 5.4 GW.

Photovoltaic 
Neoen's main solar energy plants are in Argentina, Australia, France,  Jamaica, Mexico, Mozambique, El Salvador, Portugal and Zambia.

In France, Neoen built and operates the Cestas solar farm, in the Gironde department. With 980,000 solar panels, the 260-hectare farm was the largest of its kind in Europe when it opened on 1 December 2015. At 300 MWp it remains the largest in France. With an annual production of 350 GWh, it can cover household consumption for the 240,000 inhabitants of Bordeaux (excluding heating).

Neoen has been operating Providencia Solar, (101 MWp) in El Salvador, the biggest solar power plant in Central America at the time of commissioning in 2016. In 2017, the 140 MWp Capella Solar project reinforced the company's presence in El Salvador. Neoen is also present in Argentina and plans to build two 100-MWp solar farms near San Antonio de los Cobres in the province of Salta. In Mexico the company is developing and will  operate the 800-hectare El Llano farm in central Mexico (375 MWp).

In 2020, Neoen announced the construction of the Western Downs Green Power Hub (460 MWp), Australia's largest solar park. Spanning  1,545 hectares (equivalent to 2100 football pitches), the new farm  will produce up to 1,080 GWh per year.

As at the end of June 2021, Neoen had 58 solar power plants in operation or under construction around the world, with a total capacity of approximately 2.7 GWp.

In 2021, Neoen commissioned its Altiplano solar plant (208 MWp) in Argentina. Situated at an altitude of 4,000 metres above sea level, the site has some of the highest levels of solar irradiance in the world.
Wind power

Neoen's wind power operations are focused on four countries with abundant resources: Australia, France, Finland and Ireland. The 40 plants in operation or under construction  have a combined capacity of 2.0  (as at 31 December 2021).

In 2017, Neoen commissioned the first phase of its Hornsdale Wind Farm in Australia, with 99 wind turbines and a capacity of 316 MW.

On 3 July 2020, Neoen announced the commissioning of its Hedet wind farm in Finland. The 81-MW farm will supply Google with green electricity for its data centre in Hamina.

In 2021, Neoen began construction on the Mutkalampi wind farm (404 MW) in Finland and the Kaban Green Power Hub (157 MW) in Australia. In December, it commissioned the Bulgana Green Power Hub (194 MW of wind power and 20 MW of battery storage), located in Australia.

Energy Storage

To overcome the intermittency of renewable power sources, Neoen also builds and operates lithium-ion batteries to store electricity.  Costs have fallen by a factor of seven in the last nine years, allowing Neoen  to develop storage on a large scale, with seven plants totalling a capacity of 642 MW/842 MWh.

In 2017, Neoen installed the world's largest lithium-ion battery (initially 100 MW/ 129MWh, increased to 150 MW/ 193.5 MWh in 2020) built by the American company Tesla, at the Hornsdale Power Reserve in the Mid North region of South Australia to provide grid-support services. In another collaboration with Tesla, Neoen also commissioned its  future construction of the Victorian Big Battery located near Melbourne (300 MW/ 450 MWh), one of the most powerful in the world. As at March 2022, these are the two largest batteries in Australia.

In 2020, Neoen began operating a large storage unit in Finland. The 30MW/30MWh Yllikkälä Power Reserve One is the first large-capacity battery to be connected to the Finnish grid.

In 2021, Neoen built the Albireo Power Reserve, comprising two 11 MW/8 MWh batteries for the Capella (140 MWp) and Providencia (101 MWp) solar plants. Neoen will reach a total capacity of 14 MW in El Salvador, with storage of 10 MWh, making it Central America's number one battery storage operator.

In April 2022, Neoen launched a new virtual battery service, with AGL Energy as its first customer. The virtual battery service will allow major energy consumers and distributors to replicate the functionality of a high-capacity battery without the need to own or build one.

Governance 
The company is an S.A. Corporation, whose main shareholder is Jacques Veyrat (former chairman of Louis Dreyfus) via his company Impala. Xavier Barbaro is Neoen's chairman and founder. Neoen is listed in Compartment A of the Euronext’s regulated market in Paris.

Directors:

Xavier Barbaro – CEO and founder.

Romain Desrousseaux – Deputy CEO since 2013.

Norbert Thouvenot – Chief Operating Officer since 2021.

Olga Kharitonova – General Counsel since 2018.

Louis Matthieu Perrin – Financial Director since 2019.

Shares as at 31/12/21

References 

Electric power companies of Australia
Electric power companies of France
Renewable energy companies of France
Renewable resource companies established in 2008
French companies established in 2008
French brands
Companies listed on Euronext Paris